M112 may refer to:
 M-112 highway (Michigan), a road in the United States of America
 HMS Shoreham (M112), a British Royal Navy Sandown-class minehunter
 Mercedes-Benz M112 engine, a V6 automobile piston engine family used in the 2000s
 Myasishchev M-112, a cargo-passenger aircraft produced by Myasishchev
 M112, a C-4 demolition charge